Perry Duke Maxwell (June 13, 1879 – November 15, 1952) was an American golf course architect. He was a founding member of the American Society of Golf Course Architects and was an inductee into the Oklahoma Sports Hall of Fame in 2012. He was known as the "father of Oklahoma golf".

Early life
Perry Duke Maxwell was born on June 13, 1879 in Princeton, Kentucky, to parents of Scottish descent. Maxwell was the son of Dr. James A. Maxwell (born 1847) and Caroline H. "Carrie" Harris (born 1851). He and his wife Ray had four children, daughters Elizabeth, Mary and Dora and son James Press Maxwell.He moved to Ardmore, Oklahoma, in 1897 after two forays at college where he studied classical literature.  In 1902 he found the love of his life, Ray Woods, and they married that same year.  Poor health temporarily curtailed his collegiate studies but he finally graduated and settled into a banking job and eventually became vice president of the Ardmore National Bank where he would remain into his mid-30s.

In 1913, on land he owned that was the site of a former dairy farm, Maxwell built the first nine holes of Dornick Hills Golf & Country Club in Ardmore.  The remaining nine holes would not be completed until 1923.  Maxwell—along with other fine golf course architects of this period such as Herbert Strong and Donald Ross—was not formally trained in golf course architecture. Most golf course architects who worked in the United States during the late 19th and early 20th century were immigrants from Scotland and England whose sole qualifications were their knowledge of golf and ability to play the game.

Dornick Hills Golf & Country Club
Maxwell is credited with many of the great layouts in Oklahoma and throughout the United States and is commonly recognized as one of America's great golf course designers. One of Maxwell's first courses was Dornick Hills Golf & Country Club in Ardmore, Oklahoma, which hosted the 1952–1954 Ardmore Open as well as the 1954 LPGA Ardmore Open. Maxwell also built Southern Hills Country Club in Tulsa (the site of several PGA Tour events and the U.S. Open in 1958, 1977 and 2001). The Oklahoma City Golf & Country Club and Prairie Dunes Country Club also appear on Maxwell's résumé. He made major contributions to such revered layouts as Pine Valley Golf Club, Augusta National Golf Club (home of the Masters), Colonial Country Club, Crystal Downs Country Club, and Merion Golf Club. In total, Maxwell is estimated to have designed 70 courses and remodeled about 50 others.

Scottish influence in his designs
The spark for a career in golf came when his wife showed him an article in Scribner's Magazine about the National Golf Links of America in Southampton, New York. After consulting with Charles B. Macdonald, the founder and architect of the club on Long Island, Maxwell proceeded to lay out four holes on a dairy farm he owned just north of Ardmore, a property that would eventually evolve into Dornick Hills Golf & Country Club where he was the first designer to implement grass greens in Oklahoma. In the early days of golf, it was common to see greens constructed of oiled and compacted sand.

In 1923, Maxwell took a trip to Scotland to learn as much as he could about the methods the Scots employed to utilize the landscape and other natural features on their courses.  From that point forward, Maxwell's design philosophy was set in place.  Some of his earliest works included the superb layouts at Twin Hills Golf & Country Club in Oklahoma City (host of the 1935 PGA Championship won by Johnny Revolta), the Muskogee Country Club, and Hillcrest Country Club in Bartlesville. But his masterpiece was the extension of Dornick Hills to 18 holes, a layout that was considered the best course in the state of Oklahoma for many years.

Augusta National Golf Club renovations
Maxwell made a number of important changes to Augusta National in 1937. When Augusta National originally opened for play in January 1933, the opening hole (now the 10th) was a relatively benign par 4 that played just more than 400 yards. From an elevated tee, the hole required little more than a short iron or wedge for the approach.  Maxwell had grand plans to improve the hole, and he implemented them by moving the green in 1937 to its present location—on top of the hill, about 50 yards back from the old site—and transformed it into the toughest hole in Masters Tournament history. Ben Crenshaw referred to Maxwell's work on the 10th hole as "one of the great strokes in golf architecture". The 10th hole at Augusta has been voted on by members of the PGA of America as one of the ten most difficult holes in the country.

Maxwell's design philosophy
Maxwell's primary course trademarks were his undulating greens and ability to use the existing natural topography to design challenging holes. Maxwell-designed greens are typically large and contoured with swells—often known as "Maxwell's rolls". It is frequently necessary to be below the hole in order to have a decent opportunity to make a putt on Maxwell-designed greens. Many golf course designers would follow his lead in creating demanding, undulating greens. Maxwell was also a master at using the natural landscape to sculpt holes. Mac Bentley, Daily Oklahoman sports writer, wrote in 1933, "His genius came from recognizing Mother Nature's design, his courses only slightly carved out of the existing landscape".

Perhaps his favorite design feature was to include naturally occurring geological cliffs. He built a green atop a 50-foot cliff on the par 5 16th hole at Dornick Hills. The green is reachable in two shots by long hitters. Most players, however, opt for a lay up shot to set up a short iron approach to the elevated green.  On the next hole golfers tee off from the cliff summit and play sharply downward to a par 3 green below. The par 3 fourth hole at Twin Hills Golf & Country Club also features Maxwell's cliff attribute.

In the 1930s Maxwell became a national force in the golf industry. In 1931 Dr. Alister MacKenzie, who with Bobby Jones was involved in the development of Augusta National in Georgia, invited Maxwell to become a partner.  Maxwell had met MacKenzie during his visit to Scotland in 1919. This dynamic duo would become one of the more celebrated golf course design teams in America, creating such successful joint ventures as Crystal Downs Country Club in Michigan, Melrose Country Club in Philadelphia and what is now the Oklahoma City Golf & Country Club. MacKenzie was involved in the design process to varying degrees of each course project.

Later years
With MacKenzie's death in 1934 and the dissolution of the partnership, Maxwell began the most fruitful phase of his career. This was a monumental accomplishment considering the nation was still in the grip of the devastating Great Depression and accompanying Dust Bowl that plagued the American midwest.  During this financially difficult time he was still able to get contracts to work on such innovative designs as Southern Hills, Prairie Dunes in Kansas and the Old Town Club in Winston-Salem, North Carolina. But perhaps the best known aspect of Maxwell's work during this stage of his career was his prolific renovation work. He is credited with major contributions to several of the top courses around the country, including Pine Valley Golf Club, Gulph Mills, Philadelphia Country Club, Brook Hollow, Colonial Country Club (Fort Worth), Saucon Valley Country Club in Upper Saucon Township, the National Golf Links and, perhaps his best-known redesign, Augusta National, where he did renovations on 11 of the 18 holes.
  
After World War II Maxwell continued working, even after losing a leg from below the knee due to cancer. But by this time Maxwell's focus was once again on Oklahoma. His son, J. Press Maxwell, had joined the business after returning from his tour of duty in Europe. The Maxwells had several notable efforts in Oklahoma in the late 1940s, including Oakwood Country Club in Enid and the University of Oklahoma course in Norman. They also did the first golf course at the Grand Hotel in Mobile, Alabama. Among other projects completed just prior to his death in 1952 were Lake Hefner Golf Club in Oklahoma City, the Oak Cliff Country Club in Dallas, Texas, and a major renovation of the Omaha Country Club in Omaha, Nebraska.

Death
Maxwell died in Tulsa, Oklahoma, on November 15, 1952. He was buried in a family cemetery on a ridge north of the 7th fairway at Dornick Hills Golf & Country Club.

Courses designed and renovated by Maxwell
(Source):

Solo designs by Perry Maxwell
 Dornick Hills Golf & Country Club, Ardmore, Oklahoma, 1913–23 

 Norman Country Club (NLE), Norman, Oklahoma, 1921
 Duncan Golf & Country Club, Duncan, Oklahoma, 1922
 Rowanis Country Club (NLE), Gainesville, Texas, 1922
 Hill Crest Country Club (NLE), Pauls Valley, OK, 1922
 Enid Country Club (9 holes) (NLE), Enid, OK, 1922
 Henryetta Golf and Country Club, Henryetta, Oklahoma, 1923
 Elks Golf and Country Club, Shawnee, Oklahoma, 1923
 Cherokee Hills Golf Club, Catoosa, Oklahoma, 1924
 Sand Springs Country Club (NLE) Sand Springs, Oklahoma, 1924
 Glenwood Golf Course (NLE), Ardmore, Oklahoma, 1924
 Muskogee Country Club (redesign), Muskogee, Oklahoma, 1924
 Neosho Golf and Country Club, Neosho, Missouri, 1924
 Pennsylvania Golf Club (NLE), Llarnech, Pennsylvania, 1924
 Arkansas City Country Club, Arkansas City, Kansas, 1925
 Kennedy Golf Course (NLE), Tulsa, Oklahoma, 1925
 Hickory Hills Country Club, Springfield, Missouri, 1925
 Twin Hills Golf & Country Club, Oklahoma City, Oklahoma, 1925
 Highland Park Golf Course (NLE), Tulsa, Oklahoma, 1925
 Riverside Country Club, Tishomingo, Oklahoma, 1925
 Perry Golf and Country Club, Perry, Oklahoma, 1925
 Oak Hills Golf & Country Club, Ada, Oklahoma, 1926
 Rolling Hills Country Club, Paducah, Kentucky, 1926
 Hardscrabble Country Club, Fort Smith, Arkansas, 1927
 Mohawk Park Golf Course, Tulsa, Oklahoma, 1927
 Lakeside Golf & Beach Club (NLE), Tulsa, Oklahoma, 1927
 Hillcrest Country Club, Bartlesville, Oklahoma, 1927
 Hill Crest Golf Course (NLE), Wilson, Oklahoma, 1927
 Ponca City Country Club (redesign), Ponca City, Oklahoma, 1927
 Buffalo Rock Golf and Venue, Cushing, Oklahoma, 1927
 Hillsdale Golf Club (NLE), Ardmore, Oklahoma, 1928
 Jeffersonville Country Club (NLE), Prather, Indiana, 1927
 Fayetteville Country Club, Fayetteville, Arkansas, 1928
 Noble Park Golf Course (NLE), Paducah, Kentucky, 1928
 Altus Country Club (NLE), Altus, OK, 1928
 Shawnee Country Club, Shawnee, Oklahoma, 1929
 Rancho Beach and Country Club (NLE), Oklahoma City, Oklahoma, 1929
 Rochelle Country Club, Rochelle, Illinois, 1930
 Princeton Country Club, Princeton, Kentucky, 1931
 Walnut Hill Country Club (NLE), Dallas, Texas, 1932
 Hillcrest Golf Course, Coffeyville, Kansas, 1933
 Avery Golf Club (NLE), Tulsa, OK, 1933
 Iowa State University Golf Course, Ames, Iowa, 1938
 Southern Hills Country Club, Tulsa, Oklahoma, 1935–36
 Lawrence Country Club (9 holes), Lawrence, Kansas 1936
 McPherson Country Club, McPherson, Kansas, 1936
 Topeka Country Club (redesign), Topeka, Kansas, 1938
 Blackwell Municipal Golf Course, Blackwell, Oklahoma, 1939
 Mount Pleasant Country Club, Mount Pleasant, Texas, 1939
 Old Town Club, Winston-Salem, North Carolina, 1939
 Reynolds Park Golf Course, Winston-Salem, North Carolina, 1940
 Hillandale Golf Club (9 holes), Durham, North Carolina, c. 1940
 Gillespie Golf Club, Greensboro, North Carolina, 1941
 Odessa Country Club (9 holes), Odessa, Texas, 1941

Co-designed with Art Jackson
 Lincoln Park Golf Course (East course), Oklahoma City, Oklahoma, 1926

Co-designed with John Bredemus and Marvin Leonard
 Colonial Country Club (Fort Worth), Fort Worth, Texas, 1934

Co-designed with Alister MacKenzie
 Melrose Country Club, Cheltenham, Pennsylvania, 1924–26
 Oklahoma City Golf & Country Club,† Oklahoma City, Oklahoma, 1927
 Crystal Downs Country Club, Frankfort, Michigan, 1928-1931
 University of Michigan Golf Course, Ann Arbor, Michigan, 1929
 Ohio State University Golf Course,‡ Columbus, Ohio, 1935 
† co-design in contract only‡ construction by Maxwell, design by MacKenzie

Co-designed with J. Press Maxwell
 Prairie Dunes Country Club, Hutchinson, Kansas, 1937, 1957
 Lakewood Country Club, Point Clear, Alabama, 1944–47
 Lake View Golf Club (NLE), Woodville, Oklahoma, 1946
 Austin Country Club, Austin, Texas, 1946–48
 Excelsior Springs Par 3 Golf Course (NLE), Excelsior Springs, Missouri, 1947
 Grandview Municipal Golf Course, Springfield, Missouri, 1947
 Oakwood Country Club, Enid, Oklahoma, 1947–48
 Lawton Country Club, Lawton, Oklahoma, 1948
 Kentucky Dam Village, Kentucky Dam Village, Kentucky, 1948
 Camp Hood Golf Course (NLE), Camp Hood, Texas, 1948
 Randolph Oaks Golf Course, Randolph AFB, Texas, 1948
 F. E. Warren AFB Golf Course, Cheyenne, Wyoming, 1948
 Bayou DeSiard Country Club, Monroe, Louisiana, 1949
 Palmetto Country Club (NLE), Benton, Louisiana, 1950
 University of Oklahoma Golf Course, Norman, Oklahoma, 1950
 Oak Cliff Country Club, Dallas, Texas, 1951
 River Hills Golf Club (NLE), Irving, Texas, 1951
 Lake Hefner Golf Course, Oklahoma City, Oklahoma, 1951

Renovations by Perry Maxwell
 Lincoln Park Golf Course (green renovation), Oklahoma City, Oklahoma, 1926
 Philadelphia Country Club (one hole and greens), Philadelphia, Pennsylvania, 1933
 Pine Valley Golf Club (three holes), Clementon, New Jersey, 1933
 Sunnybrook Golf Club (greens), Flourtown, Pennsylvania, 1934
 Gulph Mills Country Club (five holes), King of Prussia, Pennsylvania, 1934–38
 The National Golf Links of America (unknown), Southampton, New York, 1935
 Dornick Hills Golf & Country Club (three holes), Ardmore, Oklahoma, 1936
 Links Golf Club (greens), Long Island, New York, 1936
 Oaks Country Club (six holes), Tulsa, Oklahoma, 1936
 Augusta National Golf Club (11 holes), Augusta, Georgia, 1937–38
 North Fulton Golf Course (up to four holes), Atlanta, Georgia 1937
 Merion Golf Club (greens), Ardmore, Pennsylvania, 1938
 Hillandale Country Club (green renovation), Hillandale, North Carolina, 1938
 Huntington Crescent Club (unknown), Long Island, New York, 1939
 Rockaway Hunting Club (unknown), Long Island, New York, 1939
 Maidstone Golf Club (renovation plan), Long Island, New York, 1939
 Westchester Country Club (multiple holes), Westchester, New York, 1939
 Twin Hills Golf & Country Club (greens), Oklahoma City, Oklahoma, 1939
 Colonial Country Club, Fort Worth, Texas, 1940
 Brook Hollow Country Club (greens), Dallas, Texas, 1940
 Hope Valley Country Club (all greens), Durham, North Carolina, 1940
 Clearwater Country Club (all greens, four holes), Clearwater, Florida, 1940–45
 Saucon Valley Country Club (two holes), Bethlehem, Pennsylvania, 1944
 Salina Country Club (four holes), Salina, Kansas, 1945
 Lincoln Homestead Park Golf Course (greens), Springfield, Kentucky, 1948
 Omaha Country Club (several holes), Omaha, Nebraska, 1951

See also
List of golf course architects

References

Golf course architects
People from Princeton, Kentucky
People from Ardmore, Oklahoma
1879 births
1952 deaths